"Shchedryk" (from , "Bountiful Evening") is a Ukrainian shchedrivka, or New Year's song, known in English as "The Little Swallow". It was arranged by composer and teacher Mykola Leontovych in 1916, and tells a story of a swallow flying into a household to sing of wealth that will come with the following spring. "Shchedryk" was originally sung on the night of January 13, New Year's Eve in the Julian Calendar (December 31 Old Style), which is Shchedry Vechir. Early performances of the piece were made by students at Kyiv University.

"Shchedryk" was later adapted as an English Christmas carol, "Carol of the Bells", by Peter J. Wilhousky following a performance of the original song by Alexander Koshetz's Ukrainian National Chorus at Carnegie Hall on October 5, 1922. Wilhousky copyrighted and published his new lyrics (which were not based on the Ukrainian lyrics) in 1936, and the song became popular in the United States and Canada, where it became strongly associated with Christmas.

Conceptually, the Ukrainian lyrics of this song meet the definition of a shchedrivka, while the English content of "The Little Swallow" identifies it as a koliadka.

History

Origin

Shchedryk ("Bountiful Evening") is a Ukrainian shchedrivka, or New Year's song, known in English as "The Little Swallow". It tells a story of a swallow flying into a household to proclaim the plentiful and bountiful year that the family will have. The title is derived from the Ukrainian word for "bountiful". The song is based on a traditional folk chant whose language was thought to have magical properties. The original traditional Ukrainian text used a device known as hemiola in the rhythm (alternating the accents within each measure from 3/4 to 6/8 and back again). The chant based on an ostinato four-note pattern within the range of a minor third is thought to be of prehistoric origins and was associated with the coming New Year which in Ukraine before the introduction of Christianity was originally celebrated in April. Conceptually, the Ukrainian lyrics of this song meet the definition of a shchedrivka, while the English content of "The Little Swallow" identifies it as a kolyadka.

With the introduction of Christianity to Ukraine, the celebration of the New Year was moved from April to January and "Shchedryk" became associated with the Feast of Epiphany also known in Ukrainian as Shchedry vechir, January 18 in the Julian calendar. It was originally sung on the night of January 13, New Year's Eve in the Julian Calendar (December 31 Old Style), which is Shchedry Vechir. In modern Ukraine, the song is again sung on the eve of the Julian New Year (January 13).

Arrangement by Leontovych

The four-note melody over a minor third of the chant was used by Ukrainian composer and teacher Mykola Leontovych as an ostinato theme in a number of arrangements he made. It is the most famous of all his songs.

"Shchedryk" is generally said to have been first performed by students at Kyiv University on 25 December 1916. However, it was first performed on 29 December 1916 in the Kyiv Merchants' Assembly Hall, now part of the National Philharmonic of Ukraine. The arrangement for mixed voice choir a cappella was popularized by the Ukrainian Republic Capella directed by Oleksander Koshetz when it toured Europe in 1920/21. The first recording was made in New York in October 1922 for Brunswick Records.

"Carol of the Bells"

"Shchedryk" was later adapted as an English Christmas carol, "Carol of the Bells", by Peter J. Wilhousky of NBC Radio, following a performance of the original song by Alexander Koshetz's Ukrainian National Chorus at Carnegie Hall on October 5, 1922. Wilhousky copyrighted and published his new lyrics (which were not based on the Ukrainian lyrics) in 1936, and the song became popular in the United States and Canada, where it became strongly associated with Christmas.

Although "Carol of the Bells" uses the melody from "," the lyrics of these two songs have nothing in common. The ostinato of the Ukrainian song suggested to Wilhousky the sound of ringing bells, so he wrote lyrics on that theme. Several other lyricists have written for the same melody, usually retaining the Wilhousky’s bell theme. A 1947 version, "Ring, Christmas Bells," is a Christian devotional song. There is also an English adaptation of the original Ukrainian by Stepan Pasicznyk.

Lyrics

See also
 Koleda
 Malanka

References

Sources
 
 
  (English text version)

Further reading

External links

 

New Year songs
1916 songs
Winter traditions
Compositions by Mykola Leontovych
Ukrainian folk songs
Articles containing video clips
Songs about birds